The Harder They Come is a novel by T. Coraghessan Boyle published in March 2015. It is loosely based on events in the life of Aaron Bassler, who, like Adam Stensen in the novel, was for 36 days in 2011 the subject of a manhunt in Mendocino County, California.<ref>Like Adam Stensen in the novel, Aaron Bassler murdered two people in Mendocino County, attacked the Chinese Consulate in San Francisco, and crashed his truck into some tennis courts at a middle school. 'SeeBassler, James (October 2011) "Another Plea for Help." mentalillnesspolicy.org, re-printed from the Fort Bragg Advocate. (Retrieved 4-28-2015.)</ref>

 Plot The Harder They Come follows the unfolding relationship between Sten Stensen, his son Adam, and Adam's girlfriend Sara Hovarty Jennings in modern-day Northern California. The story alternates between their three points of view.  The story begins with Sten,  former Marine and Vietnam veteran, killing a mugger while on a vacation cruise in Puerto Limón (Costa Rica).  The story then moves to California, where Sten is unable to understand or help his schizophrenic son, who considers himself a "mountain man" modeled on his hero John Colter. Meanwhile, Adam begins a relationship with Sara, a believer in the Sovereign citizen movement, whom he considers to be a kindred spirit due to her own problems with the law and her professed belief in the illegitimacy of laws and law enforcement. His paranoia worsens, leading to Adam shooting two people and escaping into the mountains to avoid arrest.

 Praise 
Michiko Kakutani of the New York Times called The Harder They Come "stunning" and "a masterly — and arresting — piece of storytelling, arguably Mr. Boyle’s most powerful, kinetic novel yet". Kakutani continues, The Harder They Come'' reaffirms Boyle's "fascination with characters who pit themselves against their neighbors, the system and nature; freedom as both a founding principle of America — and an invitation to rebellion and self-indulgence; and the dark fallout of ideological certainty and obsession."

References

External links
 

2015 American novels
Novels by T. C. Boyle
Ecco Press books